Trick'N Snowboarder, known in Japan as , is a snowboarding video game published by Capcom in 1999. It is the follow-up to Cave's previous snowboarding game, Steep Slope Sliders. Unlike its predecessor, which was released into arcades, Trick'N Snowboarder is a console exclusive title.

Scenario Mode 
Scenario mode takes the player through ten stages with specific goals for completion of each stage, similar to that of other extreme sports games like Tony Hawk's Pro Skater. These goals primarily revolve around the goal of capturing the best tricks and stunts for a series of videos that the player is involved in shooting, though there are three instances where an opponent challenges the player to either a score-based or time-based challenge.

Gameplay 
The game sticks to the standard recipe for snowboarding titles: wild downhill courses with jump-off points and occasional obstacles; different modes such as alpine, half-pipe, and single-jump competitions; and marginal extras like replay saves and player/title logo-edit functions. It includes the Resident Evil 2 characters Leon S. Kennedy, Claire Redfield, and a Zombie Cop as playable snowboarders.

Reception 

Trick'N Snowboarder received "mixed" reviews according to video game review aggregator GameRankings. In Japan, Famitsu gave it a score of 29 out of 40.

References

External links 
 

1999 video games
Capcom games
PlayStation (console) games
PlayStation (console)-only games
Snowboarding video games
Video games developed in Japan
Video games scored by Akari Kaida
Virgin Interactive games